1835 Gajdariya, provisional designation , is a stony Koronian asteroid from the outer region of the asteroid belt, approximately 12.5 kilometers in diameter.

It was discovered on 30 July 1970, by Russian astronomer Tamara Smirnova at Crimean Astrophysical Observatory in Nauchnyj, on the Crimean peninsula. It was named after Russian writer Arkady Gaidar.

Characteristics 

The S-type asteroid is a member of the Koronis family, which is named after 158 Koronis and consists of about 300 known bodies with nearly ecliptical orbits. It orbits the Sun in the outer main-belt at a distance of 2.6–3.1 AU once every 4 years and 9 months (1,741 days). Its orbit has an eccentricity of 0.09 and an inclination of 1° with respect to the ecliptic. Its spectra is that of an S-type asteroid with a geometric albedo of about 0.24. It has a rotation period of 6.33 hours.

Naming 

It was named in honor of Soviet–Russian writer and children's author Arkady Gaidar (1904–1941), who joined the partisans and became a machine gunner during the Nazi invasion of the Soviet Union. Gaidar was killed in combat in October 1941. The official  was published by the Minor Planet Center on 1 June 1975.

References

External links 
 Asteroid Lightcurve Database (LCDB), query form (info )
 Dictionary of Minor Planet Names, Google books
 Asteroids and comets rotation curves, CdR – Observatoire de Genève, Raoul Behrend
 Discovery Circumstances: Numbered Minor Planets (1)-(5000) – Minor Planet Center
 
 

001835
Discoveries by Tamara Mikhaylovna Smirnova
Named minor planets
19700730